Danielle Coney (born July 9, 1977) is an American beauty pageant titleholder who was crowned Miss California 1998. She competed at Miss America 1999, where she won a Non-Finalist Talent Award and the Waterford Business Scholarship.

References

1977 births
Living people
People from New York City
Miss America 1999 delegates
Beauty pageant contestants from California
20th-century American people